G3, G03, G.III, G.3 or G-3 may refer to:

Politics
 G-3 (Europe), the top three economies in the European Union
 G-3 (Latin America), the grouping of Colombia, Mexico and Venezuela

Military
 AEG G.III, a German World War I heavy bomber
 Albatros G.III, a 1916 German bomber aircraft
 Caudron G.3, a 1913 French single-engined biplane
 Friedrichshafen G.III, a 1915 German medium bomber
 G-3 U. S. Army Operations (military staff)
 G3 battlecruiser, a post First World War design for the Royal Navy that was curtailed by the Washington Naval Treaty
 G3 (NATO), the Assistant Chief Of Staff or senior staff officer on Operations and Plans at the division level and higher
 Gotha G.III, a 1916 German heavy bomber
 Heckler & Koch G3, a battle rifle produced by Heckler & Koch
 Soko G-3, improved variant of Soko G-2 airplane
 , an early U.S. Navy submarine
Group of Three, a group dispatched to Lebanon in 1958, shortly before the 1958 Lebanon crisis

Electronics
 Canon PowerShot G3, a digital camera made by Canon
 G3 power state, in computer ACPI power states
 G3, a fax encoding format
 G3, a PBX from the Avaya Definity range
 Gibson G3, a 1975 bass guitar
 iAudio G3, an mp3 player from the Cowon iAudio range
 Panasonic Lumix DMC-G3, a digital interchangeable lens camera made by Panasonic
 PowerPC G3, a microprocessor branding used by Apple Computer
 LG G3, an Android smartphone developed by LG Electronics
 G3 gaming laptops series from Dell

Media
 g3 (British magazine), a UK magazine aimed at lesbian and bisexual women
 G3 (tour), a live music show and guitar tour organized by Joe Satriani and Steve Vai
 G3: Genes, Genomes, Genetics, a scientific journal in the discipline of genetics, published by the Genetics Society of America
GIII, the alternative title for the third and final film in the Gamera heisei trilogy.

Science
 ATC code G03 Sex hormones and modulators of the genital system, subgroup of the Anatomical Therapeutic Chemical Classification System
 G3 star, a subclass of G-class stars in stellar classification
 Group 3 element of the periodic table
 G3 medium in embryo culture

Transportation

Air transportation
 City Connexion Airlines, a former Burundian airline, IATA designation G3
 Gol Transportes Aéreos, a Brazilian economy airline, IATA designation G3
 Gulfstream III, an American business jet, sometimes abbreviated GIII

Automobiles
 BYD G3, a 2009–2014 Chinese compact sedan
 Enranger G3, a 2014–present Chinese subcompact SUV
 Pontiac G3, a 2008–2010 American subcompact car
 XPeng G3, a 2018–present Chinese compact electric SUV

Rail transportation
 Gaiemmae Station, station G-03 of the Tokyo Metro Ginza Line
 PRR G3, an American PRR 4-6-0 locomotive
 WLWR Class G3, a Waterford, Limerick and Western Railway Irish steam locomotive
 LNER Class G3, a class of British steam locomotives

Roads and routes
 G3 Beijing–Taipei Expressway, incomplete expressway intended to link mainland China and Taiwan

Watercraft
 G3 boats, from Yamaha Motor Corporation

Other
 Kamen Rider G3, a fictional character featured in Kamen Rider Agito
 G3 (company), or "Good Governance Group", British corporate security and intelligence company
 G-3 visa, a type of non-immigrant visa allowing travel to the United States
 G-III Apparel Group, a clothing manufacturing company
 G3 Canada, a Canadian grain company and successor to the Canadian Wheat Board

See also
 3G (disambiguation)
 GGG (disambiguation)